"Touchy!" (also known simply as "Touchy") is a song by Norwegian band A-ha, released on 15 August 1988 as the third single from their third studio album, Stay on These Roads (1988).

Critical reception
Pan-European magazine Music & Media wrote, "Being tipped by many Euro-DJs for months now, this highly commercial track just cannot fail."

Music video
The accompanying music video for "Touchy!" was directed by Kevin Moloney in France, and shows the band at a beach resort, interspersed with black-and-white footage of singer Morten Harket and the other members miming the song.

Track listings
 7-inch single: Warner Bros. / W 7749 United Kingdom
 "Touchy!"  – 4:38
 "Hurry Home" (Album Version) – 4:34

 12-inch single: Warner Bros. / W 7749T United Kingdom
 "Touchy!" (Go-Go Mix) – 8:20
 "Touchy!" (Album Version)  – 4:38
 "Hurry Home" (Album Version) – 4:34

 CD single: Warner Bros. / W 7749CD United Kingdom
 "Touchy!" (Go-Go Mix) – 8:20
 "Hurry Home" (Album Version) – 4:34
 "Hunting High and Low (Edit) - 3:47

Charts

References

1988 singles
1988 songs
A-ha songs
Song recordings produced by Alan Tarney
Songs written by Magne Furuholmen
Songs written by Morten Harket
Songs written by Paul Waaktaar-Savoy
Warner Records singles